SEPA may refer to:

The Single Euro Payments Area, a payment-integration initiative of the European Union
The Scottish Environment Protection Agency, Scotland’s environmental regulator and flood authority
State Environmental Protection Administration, former name of the Ministry of Environmental Protection of the People's Republic of China
The Seton Leather Company of Pennsylvania, an automotive leather company
Southeastern Pennsylvania, a region in the US state of Pennsylvania
The reporting mark of the Southeastern Pennsylvania Transportation Authority

Sepa may refer to:
Sepa language (disambiguation)
Sepa language (Papua New Guinea), an Oceanic language of northeast New Guinea
A lake in 108 Mile Ranch, British Columbia
Sepa, Lääne-Saare Parish, village in Lääne-Saare Parish, Saare County, Estonia
Sepa, Pihtla Parish, village in Pihtla Parish, Saare County, Estonia
Sepa, Tartu County, village in Tartu Parish, Tartu County, Estonia
Sepa (priest), an Ancient Egyptian, who lived during Third dynasty
Sepa (skipper), a genus of skippers in the family Hesperiidae